Popham Airfield   is an unlicensed airfield located  south west of Basingstoke in Hampshire, UK. It lies alongside the A303 road.

The airfield has two grass runways, designated 08/26 and 03/21. Light aircraft maintenance facilities, aircraft hire and flight training on microlight and light aircraft is available.

Popham Airfield runs many different events over the year, including the Microlight trade fair in May, the annual Motorcycle Mega Meet & Vintage Aircraft Fly-in in August and the New Year's Day Fly-in.

Popham Airfield's radio frequency is 129.805 MHz (8.33 kHz spacing) air-to-ground only with an additional operations frequency of 131.405 MHz (8.33 kHz spacing) for the resident flight school. Radio operating hours are from 08:30 until 17:00 (winter 16:30 or sunset if earlier).

The airfield is home to AirBourne Aviation, a flight training school that made international media headlines when in August 2014, one of its staff pilots discovered one of the secret filming locations for Star Wars Ep7. at Greenham Common and photographed a half-constructed, full size Millennium Falcon spaceship.

Microlight flight simulation training takes place at the airfield using a Comco Ikarus C42 flight simulator operated by AirBourne Aviation.

On 7 April 2007, Neville Duke, an RAF fighter ace in the Second World War and a well-known test pilot, made an emergency landing here in a light aircraft when he felt unwell. He collapsed after landing and died later that evening.

Footnotes

Further reading
 Pooley's Flight Guide, 2014, pp 533–534

External links
 Official website
 Video of Popham and aircraft on YouTube
 AirBourne Aviation

Airports in England
Transport in Hampshire
Airports in Hampshire